Radio Nacional de Guinea Ecuatorial is the national broadcaster of the Central African state of Equatorial Guinea. Radio Nacional de Guinea Equatorial is headquartered in the capital city, Malabo.

References
Lyngsat address

Publicly funded broadcasters
Spanish-language television stations
Radio stations established in 1967
Television channels and stations established in 1967
Mass media in Equatorial Guinea
State media
1967 establishments in Africa